Yang Cheng (born December 1964) is a lieutenant general (zhongjiang) of the People's Liberation Army (PLA) serving as political commissar of the Xinjiang Military District, succeeding Li Wei in December 2020. He is a delegate to the 13th National People's Congress.

Biography
Yang was born in Shaoyang, Hunan, in December 1964. He served in Lanzhou Military Region before being appointed political commissar of the Ngari Prefecture Military District. In March 2014, he was made deputy political commissar of the Joint Logistics Department of Lanzhou Military Region, a position he held until March 2015, when he was appointed deputy political commissar of the 21st Group Army. In March 2017, he rose to become political commissar of the newly founded 73rd Group Army. In July 2020, he was given the position of deputy political commissar of the People's Armed Police, but having held the position for only four months, and was reassigned as political commissar of the Xinjiang Military District. In June 2021, he was admitted to member of the standing committee of the Chinese Communist Party's Xinjiang Regional Committee, the region's top authority.

He was promoted to the rank of major general (Shaojiang) in July 2015 and lieutenant general (zhongjiang) in July 2020.

References

1964 births
Living people
People from Shaoyang
People's Liberation Army generals from Hunan
People's Republic of China politicians from Hunan
Chinese Communist Party politicians from Hunan
Delegates to the 13th National People's Congress